"Är du kär i mej ännu Klas-Göran?" ("Are you still in love with me, Klas-Göran?") is a song written by Stig "Stikkan" Andersson in 1959. A recording by singer Lill-Babs from 1959 became a major hit song and solid gold record in Sweden in 1960, Dutch singer Ria Valk had a hit record in The Netherlands in 1961 with a translation of the song, titled "Hou je echt nog van mij, Rocking Billy?".

Charts

References

1959 songs
Lill-Babs songs
Swedish songs
Swedish-language songs
Songs written by Stig Anderson
1959 singles
Songs about the United States